Africano Mande Gedima is the Deputy Commissioner General of the National Revenue Authority in South Sudan. He became the first Governor of Maridi State, in the Republic of South Sudan, on 24 December 2015. Africano Mande hails from Maridi County and is a Baka by tribe belonging to the Mukú clan.

Africano Mande served as an active duty Colonel and was later promoted to Brigadier General in the Sudan People’s Liberation Army (Now South Sudan People's Defence Forces) prior to his appointment as Governor on 24 December 2015.

Early life 
Africano Mande was born to the late John Mande Gedima and to the late Mama Gister Asopa who subsequently migrated to the United States of America and took up citizenship in the USA together with all of Africano’s siblings except Africano Mande.

Africano Mande started off in the Military by serving under the Sudan People’s Liberation Army (SPLA) during the days when the SPLA fought for the liberation of Sudan and subsequently the independence of South Sudan.

While in the Military, Africano Mande played a wide range of activities ranging from instruction and combat planning to operations. Africano Mande, therefore, served in the SPLA in various capacities such as an instructor, Director of Military Research, Director of Planning and Strategy, Secretary for Military Transformation, and in other classified positions.

While in the Military, Africano Mande also served as a part-time lecturer at the University of Juba among others. Africano Mande basically contributed significantly to the ideas and frameworks aimed at transforming the SPLA into what had been referred to as "professional, accountable, affordable and operational effective military."

Achievements 
Mande is known in the South Sudanese Military General Headquarters for his dictum that "the best soldier is one who talks about the next war that he is going to fight not about the war he has already fought."

Governor Africano Mande holds a Master’s Degree in National Security Studies from the Naval Postgraduate School, Monterey, California where he also won the Hans Jones Award for excellence in thesis Research in Special Operations & Irregular Warfare or Security.

Governor Africano Mande also holds a BA (Hons.) in International Relations from the United States International University – Africa.

In addition to the various Military training, Governor Africano Mande also attended other training to include training at the Institute for Security Studies in Pretoria (South Africa), International Institute for Humanitarian Law in San Remo (Italy) to mention but a few.

Upon his appointment as the Governor of the newly created Maridi State, South Sudan at a time was also faced with a raging civil war and a collapsing economy.

Maridi State, in particular, was badly hit by the civil unrest in addition to the hitches and glitches by some political saboteurs who were also said to be mentally below par such as Peter Beshir Bindi, James Saki Palaoko and James Kabila, etc.

However, Governor Africano Mande charted his way through and not only embarked on the establishment of State institutions such as the State Assembly, State Executive, Justice system, Public Services, and the law enforcement, he also set out a well-spelled vision for Maridi State which is: "a peaceful, secured, healthy, skillful, productive, informed, cultured, and ultimately economically prospered Maridi State with good accessibility and whose populations are availed access to social services and opportunities to become innovative and progressive."

In order to work towards achieving this vision, Governor Africano Mande set out eight (8) sector-specific policy priorities that form Maridi State Government’s programs for implementation.

Within these sector-specific priorities, security, peace, Rule of Law, the establishment of the new counties, enhanced capacities for production and for economic rehabilitation and growth, building capacity to deliver physical infrastructural services remain high on the agenda of the Government of Maridi State.

With the huge economic challenges that South Sudan went through, Governor Africano Mande began preaching that: "We must do more with less". Within two years, Maridi State became a progressive and most stable and peaceful state in the Republic of South Sudan.

Agriculture production increased, State Government revenue increased and social services improved.

Africano Mande has survived multiple attacks to his life and personality ranging from attempted assassination to blackmailing and witch-hunting.

Whenever asked about these attacks on his life and personality, he often said that: "unfortunately we all live on this very earth where every day that comes unfolds new interests and burry our moralities. I know all those who have done all these are attacks on me and they did these things to me because there have been driven by their selfish interests, not their moralities.

Let them wait for my interest to the surface also and they will pay the heaviest prices ever." Africano Mande has however remained calm, composed and steady and often acting as if nothing happened to the extent of even interacting and helping out the very perpetrators.

Nevertheless, Africano Mande is said to be forgiving but not forgetful. Africano Mande has been described by his closest friends that is smart in hitting back at his enemies when they least expect.

Africano Mande’s passion has been in farming, wildlife conservation, Art and music, and poetry. Among some of the poems by Governor Africano Mande are: "Walking the Print of Lord", "Ana Zalaan", "The Colour Deserved", "The Sacred Children", "We the People", "My story", "The Warrior’s Hymn", "Letter to my Dad", "Silent Departure", and "Woman’s World".

Mande has also produced two (2) unpublished book manuscripts which he hopes to publish in the future. Mande's dedication to his Country and to Maridi State encouraged his brothers and sisters to establish the Africano Mande Foundation (AMF) which to them is strictly a non-political and non-governmental Foundation named after Africano Mande Gedima, the first Governor of Maridi State.

As its name suggests, the Foundation is a legacy Foundation which was founded by the family of Africano Mande Gedima in order to champion his philosophy, ideals, and vision through the philanthropic and non-governmental tracks.

Despite Africano Mande’s commitment to serving his country, South Sudan, he has been a family man. Africano Mande has been married to Joyce Tindilo and has five children whom Africano often urged to put God first before anything else.

Mande who has been a disciplinarian in the family has managed to create a very strong network of family members and relatives who often come together at least once every year in Africano’s home in Maridi town.

References 

Year of birth missing (living people)
Living people
Naval Postgraduate School alumni
South Sudanese politicians